Roger Fairchild (born c. 1953) is an American politician from Fruitland, Idaho, active in the 1980s and early 1990s. He was the Republican nominee for governor of Idaho in 1990, but was defeated by the Democratic incumbent, Cecil Andrus.

Fairchild was a member of the Idaho Senate from 1980 to 1990, when he resigned to run for governor.

In 2002, Fairchild announced his candidacy for state senate, running for the 9th district. He was defeated in the Republican primary by Monty Pearce.

References

Year of birth missing (living people)
Living people
Republican Party Idaho state senators
People from Fruitland, Idaho